Nima Atrkar Rowshan (Persian نیما عطرکار روشن) (born September 5, 1985) is an Iranian contemporary classical music composer. Rowshan studied music in Iran & France. He has studied orchestration in École Normale de Musique de Paris with Michel Merlet. He has also received lessons from Alireza Mashayekhi & Mehran Rouhani. A collection of his works "Silence - Rest" is published under Hermes Records in 2012. His works has also been published by Petrichor Records, Noise a Noise, and Sound Carrier. 
His music is often described as post-minimal.

He was commissioned by SWR to compose a piece for Klangforum Wien to be premiered in 100th edition of Donaueschingen Festival.

He is based in Tehran, and his works have been performed variously in festivals and events in the US, Europe, Asia and the middle east. He is also the curator of discussion panels in Tehran Contemporary Music Festival and art director of Aleph Foundation.

Education 
He began studying music by playing the piano. By entering the Art university of Tehran in 2005, he studied with Hamed Mohajer and in the same time he started composition experimentally and through studying the great composers. Nima later attended master classes of "Alireza Mashayekhi. He co-founded "Ensemble-M" in 2006 to perform & introduce contemporary classical music in Iran. In 2009 he decided to pursue further studies with Michel Merlet at the ècole normale de musique de Paris.

See also 

 Contemporary classical music
 Experimental Music
 Tehran Contemporary Music Festival

References

External links 
 
 Official page at Hermes Records
 Discography at ITunes

1985 births
Iranian classical composers
Living people
École Normale de Musique de Paris alumni